Pitheavlis Castle , located in Perth, Scotland, was built in the late 16th century. Now a Category A listed building, it stands in a residential neighbourhood on Needless Road. No historical event is connected with the castle.

The castle was the home of the Oliphant family until the 17th century. It later became the property of the Murray family. In the early 20th century, it was bought by Montolieu Oliphant-Murray, 1st Viscount Elibank, then whisky baron Sir Robert Usher. He owned it until 1920. It is now divided into flats.

See also
List of Category A listed buildings in Perth and Kinross
List of listed buildings in Perth, Scotland

References

Bibliography
Gifford, John (2007) The Buildings of Scotland: Perth and Kinross. Yale University Press, New Haven and London
Haynes, Nick (2000) Perth & Kinross: An Illustrated Architectural Guide. The Rutland Press, Edinburgh
MacGibbon, David and Thomas Ross (1887) The Castellated and Domestic Architecture of Scotland. David Douglas, Edinburgh

External links
Perth, Needless Road, Pitheavlis Castle – Canmore

Castles in Perth, Scotland
Category A listed buildings in Perth and Kinross
Listed castles in Scotland
Buildings and structures completed in the 16th century
16th-century establishments in Scotland
Listed buildings in Perth, Scotland